Mariateguist Unified Party (in Spanish: Partido Unificado Mariateguista – PUM) was a political party in Peru founded in 1984 by Revolutionary Vanguard (VR), Revolutionary Left Movement (MIR), Workers Revolutionary Party (PRT) and a sector of Revolutionary Communist Party (PCR). Leaders included Javier Diez Canseco, Agustín Haya de la Torre, Santiago Pedráglio, Hugo Blanco, Eduardo Cáceres and Carlos Tapia.  Maria Elena Moyano was also a member of PUM.

PUM was a part of United Left (IU). In 1990, PUM withdrew from IU. In 1995, it rejoined IU, together with UNIR.

References 

1984 establishments in Peru
Defunct political parties in Peru
Defunct socialist parties
Political parties established in 1984
Political parties with year of disestablishment missing
Socialist parties in Peru